The 1935–36 Cincinnati Bearcats men's basketball team represented the University of Cincinnati during the 1935–36 NCAA men's basketball season. The head coach was Tay Brown, coaching his third season with the Bearcats. The team finished with an overall record of 10–7.

Schedule

|-

References

Cincinnati Bearcats men's basketball seasons
Cincinnati
Cincinnati Bearcats men's basketball team
Cincinnati Bearcats men's basketball team